Stanbridge East is a municipality in the Canadian province of Quebec, located within the Brome-Missisquoi Regional County Municipality. The population as of the Canada 2011 Census was 873.

History
The Township of Stanbridge was first surveyed by Jesse Pennoyer in the year 1792. It was subsequently opened for settlement, reversing the old policy of the day "no settlements along the frontier". In 1997 the township changed its form of government and became Stanbridge East.  The village became the film location for the fictional setting of Three Pines, Quebec, in the 2013 made-for-television movie "Still Life" (based on Louise Penny's novel about Chief Inspector Armand Gamache).

Demographics

Population
Population trend:

Language
Mother tongue language (2006)

See also
List of municipalities in Quebec

References 

Municipalities in Quebec
Incorporated places in Brome-Missisquoi Regional County Municipality